Hilutangan Channel (or Gilutungan Channel) is a deep water channel that separates Mactan Island from Olango Island.

The Mactan Reef Flat lies on the port  (left) side of this channel and the Olango Reef Flat lies on the starboard (right) side of this channel.

It is one of the three channels that connect the Cebu Strait to the Camotes Sea: 
the Mactan Channel (which separates Cebu from Mactan)
the Hilutangan Channel (which separates Mactan from Olango)
the Olango Channel (which separates Olango from Bohol).

The holotype of the sea snail Tosapusia sauternesensis was described in the channel.

See also
Canigao Channel - separates the islands of Bohol and Leyte
Tañon Strait - separates the islands of Negros and Cebu

References

External links
 Hilutangan Channel Map (location & coral reefs detail)

Straits of the Philippines
Landforms of Cebu